By the Time I Get to Phoenix is the seventh album by American singer-guitarist Glen Campbell, released in November 1967 by Capitol Records.

In March 1969 the album won the Grammy for Album of the Year (for 1968), the first country album to do so. In February 1968 the album's lead single "By the Time I Get to Phoenix", released October 1967, won Grammys for both Best Vocal Performance, Male and Best Contemporary Male Solo Vocal Performance (for 1967). In 2004 "By the Time I Get to Phoenix" was inducted in the Grammy Hall of Fame.

Track listing

Personnel
Music
 Glen Campbell – vocals, acoustic guitar
 James Burton – acoustic guitar, electric guitars
 Joe Osborn – bass guitar
 Jim Gordon – drums

Production
 Al De Lory – producer, arranger, conductor
 Nick Venet – producer ("Tomorrow Never Comes")
 Mort Garson – arranger ("Cold December" and "Bad Seed")
 Leon Russell – arranger ("My Baby's Gone") 
 Jimmie Haskell – arranger ("Tomorrow Never Comes")
 Ed Simpson, Capitol Photo Studio – photography

Charts
Album – Billboard (United States)

Singles – Billboard (United States)

References

Glen Campbell albums
1967 albums
Capitol Records albums
Albums arranged by Jimmie Haskell
Albums arranged by Leon Russell
Albums produced by Nick Venet
Albums recorded at Capitol Studios
Grammy Award for Album of the Year